Pieter Soeters (born 26 May 1947) is a Dutch former professional tennis player.

Born in the Dutch East Indies, Soeters was based out of South Holland and won multiple national championships in junior tennis. Ranked as high as second nationally, he won the Dutch indoor championship title in 1970. 

Soeters appeared for the Netherlands Davis Cup team in a 1970 tie against Greece in Athens and also represented his country in the Universiade, while studying engineering at Delft University.

See also
List of Netherlands Davis Cup team representatives

References

External links
 
 
 

1947 births
Living people
Dutch male tennis players
Sportspeople from South Holland
Sportspeople from West Kalimantan
People from Pontianak
Competitors at the 1970 Summer Universiade